The 2012 Peterborough City Council election took place on 3 May 2012 to elect members of Peterborough City Council in England. The last time these seats were up for election was 2008. This was on the same day as other local elections.

The number of seats up for election were 19 (one per ward). The Conservatives retained overall control of Peterborough City Council.

Election result

Ward results

Barnack

Bretton North

Central

Dogsthorpe

East

Eye and Thorney

Fletton

Glinton and Wittering

Orton Longueville

Orton Waterville

Orton with Hampton

Park

Paston

Ravensthorpe

Stanground Central

Walton

Werrington North

Werrington South

West

References

2012
2012 English local elections